Alexei Casian (born 1 October 1987) is a Moldavian football midfielder who represents Lane Xang Intra F.C.

Club statistics
He played in 2008-2011 totally in Moldovan National Division 56 matches, scoring 3 goals. In February 2014 he moved back to Uzbekistan Premier league club FK Andijan, where he has already performed in 2011, in summer of the same year he had terminated contract because of difficult situation of the club in the league. In autumn of the year Casian joined Lane Xang Intra F.C. and signed one-year deal with Laos premier league side, on 16 September he played in the game against all star Brazilian team for opening of new stadium in Laos.

References

External links

Profile at FC Dacia Chișinău

1987 births
People from Bender, Moldova
Moldovan footballers
Living people
Association football midfielders
FK Andijon players
FC Dinamo-Auto Tiraspol players
FC Iskra-Stal players
Lanexang United F.C. players